Steven Barry Poster, A.S.C, I.C.G. (born 1 March 1944) is an American cinematographer and photographer who is the former President of the International Cinematographers Guild. He is best known for his collaborations with Richard Kelly, including the director's 2001 cult classic Donnie Darko.

Career 
Poster began his career as a creative assistant at 'The Film Group,' a commercial film production company based in Chicago, Illinois. After being promoted to director of photography due to his skill at lighting, he met Herschell Gordon Lewis and worked with him in various crew positions on a total of three films. Poster founded a production company with director Michael Mann and served as the cinematographer on numerous industrial and education films. He served as the second-unit director of photography on Close Encounters of the Third Kind. Poster joined the American Society of Cinematographers  in 1987, relocating to Hollywood in the process. He shot the iconic music video to Madonna's "Like a Prayer", as well as commercials directed by Ridley Scott and Kinka Usher. In 1988, he was nominated for the ASC Award for Outstanding Achievement in Theatrical Releases for his work on Someone to Watch Over Me. Poster served as the President of the ASC between 2002-2003. In 2006, he received an Emmy nomination for Mrs. Harris. That same year, he was elected as the National President of the International Cinematographers Guild, a position he held until 2019.

Filmography 
Film

Television

References 

1944 births
Living people
American cinematographers